Bangor Savings Bank is a state-chartered bank in the state of Maine. The company, which is headquartered in downtown Bangor, Maine, was founded in 1852 and has 54 branches across the state. As of December 2020, the bank was the largest Maine-based bank. Bangor Savings Bank has roughly $6.1 billion in assets.

History
On May 5, 1852, Bangor Savings Bank opened first location in Bangor, Maine. The first deposit was for $440. During that decade, Franklin Muzzy was one of the first trustees of the bank.

By 1889, Bangor Savings Bank had relocated to a larger space at 3 State Street and had over $4.5 million in deposits.  The facility was rebuilt in 1913 following the Bangor Great Fire, and renovated in 1951.

In 1997, the Bangor Savings Bank Foundation was created. In FY20, the bank and its foundation invested over $3.4 million into the community.

In Fall 2015, the bank announced four branches would close in early 2016. Staff were reassigned to nearby branches within 12 miles of the closed branch. In January 2016, Bangor Savings Bank announced that it was raising the company-wide minimum wage to $13 per hour. In doing so, it raised the base wage for 240 of the companies 740 employees. As of August 2022, the company's minimum wage has increased to $18 per hour.

In October 2017, Bangor Savings Bank acquired Granite Bank of New Hampshire. The acquisition was unanimously approved by boards of directors of both banks. This will bring the total assets of BSB to $4 billion and 59 branches in NH and Maine when the transaction is complete in 2018.

In May 2019, Bangor Savings Bank opened its new operations center adjacent to its headquarters.

In December 2020, Bangor Savings Bank completed its acquisition of Damariscotta Bank and Trust 

In April 2021, Bangor Savings Bank was rated #1 bank in New England by JD Power Retail Banking Satisfaction Survey, And was listed in Forbes’ World Best Banks for 2021

References

External links
 Official site

Banks based in Maine
Banks established in 1852
Companies based in Bangor, Maine
1852 establishments in Maine